Hans Peter Markström (born 2 October 1965 in Ludvika, Dalarna) is a former ice speed skater from Sweden, who represented his native country in two consecutive Winter Olympics, starting in 1992 in Albertville, France. He mainly competed in the sprint events.

References
 SkateResults
 sports-reference

External links
 

1965 births
Living people
Swedish male speed skaters
Speed skaters at the 1992 Winter Olympics
Speed skaters at the 1994 Winter Olympics
Olympic speed skaters of Sweden
Place of birth missing (living people)
20th-century Swedish people